R. Sakkarapani is an Indian Tamil politician, Minister of Tamil Nadu, and incumbent Member of the Legislative Assembly of Tamil Nadu who has been elected from Oddanchatram constituency for five consecutive periods and now as the sixth term. A member of the Dravida Munnetra Kazhagam (DMK) party, he won in 1996, 2001, 2006, 2011, 2016 and 2021 elections.

He was the Chief Government Whip of the Tamil Nadu Legislative Assembly from 2006 to 2011 and as a DMK Whip from the 2011 to 2016 Legislative assembly and also from the 2016 to 2021 assembly. He was appointed the Minister for Food and Civil Supplies of Tamil Nadu for the first time in Thiru M. K. Stalin's cabinet. He is one among the only 3 members who were consecutively elected to TamilNadu assembly from 1996 onwards for the sixth time consecutively, which record he holds along with his party counterparts M. K. Stalin and Duraimurugan.

Birth

Sakkarapani was born in a village Kaaliyappagoundanpatti (Pungavalasu) near Kallimandayam.

Elections contested

Elections

Sakkarapani contested his first election in 1996 from the Oddanchatram constituency. He defeated K. Sellamuthu of ADMK by 36823. He contested his second election from the same constituency in 2001, irrespective of ADMK sweeping the state, Sakkarapani won the Constituency by 1369 votes. In 2006 again contested from the same Oddanchatram constituency and he won by a margin of 19903. He was selected as Tamil Nadu govt. whip and also for the ruling party DMK. In 2011, Sakkarapani won against huge anti-incumbency by 14933. In the 2016 election, Sakkarapani defeated the ADMK candidate Kittusamy by a margin of 65727. His winning margin is second highest in the state behind DMK supremo Karunanidhi.

References 

Dravida Munnetra Kazhagam politicians
Living people
Tamil Nadu MLAs 1996–2001
Tamil Nadu MLAs 2001–2006
Tamil Nadu MLAs 2006–2011
Tamil Nadu MLAs 2011–2016
Tamil Nadu MLAs 2016–2021
Year of birth missing (living people)
Tamil Nadu MLAs 2021–2026